The Théâtre des Jeunes-Artistes was an 18th-century Parisian entertainment venue, now defunct, inaugurated in 1790 at 52 rue de Bondy (modern rue René-Boulanger) in the 10th arrondissement of Paris. It had a capacity of 520 spectators.

History 
Built on the site of the former Théâtre des Variétés-Amusantes on the northwest corner of the intersection of the rue de Bondy with the rue de Lancry, the theatre was  inaugurated on 26 June 1790 under the name Théâtre Français Comique et Lyrique. It took the name Jeunes-Artistes in 1794 under the direction of Jacques Robillon who set up a troupe of child actors modeled on that of the Théâtre de l'Ambigu-Comique, which faced it (the idea was again taken over by Louis Comte and his Théâtre des Jeunes-Élèves in 1820).

Despite the great success it enjoyed, the theatre was closed following the Napoleonic decree of 8 August 1807 on the limitation of Parisian theaters.

See also
 List of former or demolished entertainment venues in Paris

Notes

Bibliography 
 Philippe Chauveau, Les Théâtres parisiens disparus (1402-1986), éd. de l'Amandier, Paris, 1999  
 Wild, Nicole ([1989]). Dictionnaire des théâtres parisiens au XIXe siècle: les théâtres et la musique. Paris: Aux Amateurs de livres. .  (paperback). View formats and editions at WorldCat.

External links 

 All performances on this site
 CÉSAR

Jeunes artistes
Theatres in the 10th arrondissement of Paris
Event venues established in 1790